Kaye is a feminine given name. Notable people with the name include:

Kaye Abad, Filipino-American actress
Kaye Adams (presenter), British television presenter
Kaye Ballard, American actress who has appeared on Broadway and on television
Kaye Bell, American jockey
Kaye Coppoolse, Dutch footballer
Kaye Dacus, American author
Kaye Darveniza, Australian politician
Kaye Don, Irish speedboat racer
Kaye Elhardt, American actress
Kaye Forster, British weather presenter
Kaye Gibbons, American author
Kaye Hall, American competition swimmer
Kaye Kory, American politician
Kaye Stevens, American actress and singer
Kaye Umansky, British children's author and poet
Kaye Webb, British journalist and publisher
Kaye Wragg, British actress

Feminine given names